Women & Songs 5 is the fifth regular album, not counting special albums, in the Women & Songs franchise.

Overview
The album was released on December 4, 2001.  As always, the album is composed of tracks from the best female artists and new artists in the industry.  17 tracks are featured on this compilation including a special single remix of Faith Hill's hit "The Way You Love Me".

Track listing
 "I Need You"
(performed by LeAnn Rimes)
 "The Way You Love Me"
(performed by Faith Hill)
 "I'm Like a Bird"
(performed by Nelly Furtado)
 "Doesn't Really Matter"
(performed by Janet Jackson)
 "Down So Long"
(performed by Jewel)
 "Everywhere"
(performed by Michelle Branch)
 "Don't Get Your Back Up"
(performed by Sarah Harmer)
 "Could I Be Your Girl"
(performed by Jann Arden)
 "Just Can't Last"
(performed by Natalie Merchant)
 "Angel"
(performed by Sarah McLachlan)
 "That I Would Be Good"
(performed by Alanis Morissette)
 "Video"
(performed by India.Arie)
 "Charmed Life"
(performed by Diana Krall)
 "Miss Chatelaine"
(performed by k.d. lang)
 "Who I Am"
(performed by Jessica Andrews)
 "All I Want"
(performed by Maren Ord)
 "Songbird"
(performed by Eva Cassidy)

References
 [ Women & Songs 5 at AllMusic]

2001 compilation albums